Jafi or JAFI may refer to:

 Jewish Agency for Israel
 Banawá or Jafí, an indigenous group in Brazil
 Jafi language, a language of Brazil
 Jafi dialect, a variety of the Sorani language of Iran